Canarian cuisine refers to the typical dishes and ingredients in the cuisine of the Canary Islands, and it constitutes an important element in the culture of its inhabitants. Its main features are the freshness, variety, simplicity, and richness of its ingredients (which may be a result of the long geographical isolation the islands suffered), the mix of seafood and meat dishes, its cultural influences and the low knowledge of it by the rest of the world. Canarian cuisine is influenced by other cultures, especially that of the aboriginal inhabitants of the islands (Guanches), and has influenced Latin American cuisine (after the 20th century Canarian migration to Latin America).

Sauces and appetizers 

Many small dishes are presented in the Canary Islands as appetizers, or snacks (tapas), which are known locally as enyesques.

Mojo (pronounced mO-ho) is a sauce served with many dishes, which is made mainly of oil, garlic, vinegar, salt, red pepper, thyme, cumin, coriander and several other spices. The two main kinds are mojo rojo (red, often served with meat) and mojo verde (green, often served with fish), though both can be served with potatoes. The spicy red type is called mojo picón. This recipe is the base of the mojos of Latin America, especially Cuba, Dominican Republic, Puerto Rico, and Venezuela, due to heavy Canarian emigration, and have also influenced the cuisines of the non-Hispanic Caribbean islands.

Papas arrugadas (literally, "wrinkly potatoes", as a reference to the look of their cooked skin) are small unskinned potatoes which have been boiled in salt water and served with mojo.

One very typical Canarian product is gofio, a flour created by grinding roasted sweetcorn, which used to be the staple food for the local population for centuries. Gofio is produced locally and is added to many foods. For instance, it can be mixed with warm milk to be drunk in the morning, as well as made into a dough-like food called pella that can be eaten alongside meals. Gofio can also be stirred with fish broth and onions to create a dish called gofio escaldado or escaldón de gofio.

Local varieties of cheese are popular and numerous, specially goat cheese. Cheeses from both La Palma and Fuerteventura are protected by the Denominación de Origen label. Other notable cheeses are the Flor de Guía cheese and the queso tierno (tender cheese). Hard cheese is made into a paste called Almogrote on La Gomera island. Grilled cheese with mojo is sometimes served as a starter.

First courses 

Traditional Canarian meals usually start with soup, in order to prepare the stomach for the meal. Among the best-known soups are:
  is a kind of chunky vegetable soup with potatoes, one of the main ways Canarian people consume vegetables. Ingredients can vary largely, depending on the island. One of the most popular is the potage de berros (watercress soup). They can be machine-blended into purees, more suitable for children.
 Caldo de papas (potato soup) is a humble soup made mainly of potatoes and coriander.
 Caldo de pescado (fish soup) usually features popular fish of the islands, like the mero (grouper), sama (common dentex) and cherne (wreckfish).
 Rancho canario is a soup with chickpeas, lard, thick noodles, potatoes and meat.

Fish 

Waters around the Canary Islands are rich with a great variety of autochthonous fish. These can be prepared in many ways, including oven-roasted (sometimes covered in a salt bed), fried, and marinated in various sauces. Some preparations include:
 , boiled fish with potatoes, sweet potatoes, gofio and mojo. In Tenerife, it is served in a pot.
  (dry fish), which can include tollos (school shark strips served with sauce) and jareas (open and dried fish, similar to bacalhau, that are often eaten roasted).

Meats 

The most widely consumed meats are pork, chicken, rabbit and goat.
  is a meat-rich soup which is the Canarian equivalent to Spanish cocidos. Chicken, beef and pork meat are combined with chickpeas, corn cobs, sweet potatoes, potatoes and other vegetables (such as carrot and cabbage).
 Goat meat has been eaten in the islands since pre-Spanish times.
 Ropa vieja (literally, 'old clothes') is a dish consisting of chicken and beef mixed with potatoes and garbanzos (chickpeas). Canarian ropa vieja is the father of Cuban ropa vieja through Canarian emigration.
 Conejo en salmorejo is a traditional rabbit stew marinated in coriander sauce (not to be confused with mainland Spain's salmorejo).
 Pork is the main ingredient of dishes such as carne fiesta (literally, 'party meat') and costillas con piña (ribs with corn cobs).

Sweets and desserts 

Canarian desserts often use simple ingredients, such as cane sugar, honey, matalahuga or matalauva (anise), almonds and traditional  miel de palma (especially on the island of La Palma). Among the desserts are bienmesabe (literally, a contraction of the Spanish phrase that means 'tastes good to me'), which is a paste of almonds, honey and sugar often served with ice cream or cream and cat's tongue cookies. Frangollo is a mix of corn flour, sugar, almonds and raisins, while truchas are pastries (filled with sweet potato paste or cabell d'angel, for instance) that are prepared at Christmastime.

In El Hierro there is a cake named quesadilla which is made with cheese. Other specialities include rosquetes (ring-shaped fried pastries), quesillo (tender cheese cake), rapaduras (cane sugar candy), Príncipe Alberto (chocolate cake from La Palma) and leche asada (milk cake). Gofio is also employed in some desserts such as huevos mole, pella de gofio (milk and gofio patty) and mousse de gofio (gofio cream).

Tropical fruits, especially bananas, are widely grown and consumed in the islands, even if they are not native species.

Wines and liquors 

The wine from the malvasia grape was a product of Canarian export since the 17th century, immediately after the decline of sugar plantations and until its commerce was blocked by the British Royal Navy in the late 18th century. Nowadays the islands produce ten protected geographical indications. Canarian Denominación de Origen wines are:

 Abona (Tenerife)
 Tacoronte-Acentejo (Tenerife)
 Valle de Güímar (Tenerife)
 Valle de La Orotava (Tenerife)
 Ycoden-Daute-Isora (Tenerife)
 El Hierro
 Lanzarote
 La Palma
 La Gomera
 Gran Canaria

Licor 43 is not made on the Canary Islands, but is an ingredient commonly used to make the barraquito/zaperoco, a multilayered drink made of Licor 43, coffee, condensed milk and frothed milk.

References

External links 
 Tasting Canarian Gastronomy

Further reading
 Vera, Felisa; Sosa, Remedios; Leal, Ana; Díaz, Yurena (1987 - 2004 [seventh edition]). Lo mejor de la Cocina Canaria. Centro de la Cultura Popular Canaria (CCPC). .

Canarian culture